The Best of British £1 Notes is a compilation album and DVD by John Lydon showing his work not only with the Sex Pistols and Public Image Ltd (PiL) but also as a solo artist and collaborator and features "The Rabbit Song", a new song from his as yet unreleased second solo album. It was released by EMI and Virgin Records.

Track listing

Standard CD edition

 Sex Pistols – "Anarchy in the UK"
 PiL – "Public Image"
 PiL – "This Is Not a Love Song"
 Leftfield/Lydon – "Open Up"
 PiL – "Rise"
 PiL – "Don't Ask Me"
 PiL – "Seattle"
 Sex Pistols – "Holidays in the Sun"
 PiL – "Death Disco"
 PiL – "Flowers of Romance"
 Time Zone – "World Destruction"
 PiL – "Warrior"
 PiL – "Disappointed"
 John Lydon – "Sun"
 PiL – "Bad Life"
 PiL – "Home"
 PiL – "The Body"
 PiL – "Cruel"
 Sex Pistols – "God Save the Queen"
 John Lydon – "The Rabbit Song"

CD special edition

Disc 1
 Sex Pistols – "Anarchy in the UK"
 PiL – "Public Image"
 PiL – "This is Not a Love Song"
 Leftfield/Lydon – "Open Up"
 PiL – "Rise"
 PiL – "Don't Ask Me"
 PiL – "Seattle"
 Sex Pistols – "Holidays in the Sun"
 PiL – "Death Disco"
 PiL – "Flowers of Romance"
 Time Zone – "World Destruction"
 PiL – "Warrior"
 PiL – "Disappointed"
 John Lydon – "Sun"
 PiL – "Bad Life"
 PiL – "Home"
 PiL – "The Body"
 PiL – "Cruel"
 Sex Pistols – "God Save the Queen"
 John Lydon – "The Rabbit Song"

Disc 2

 PiL – "Death Disco" (12" Mix)
 PiL – "Poptones"
 PiL – "Careering"
 PiL – "Religion"
 PiL – "Banging the Door"
 PiL – "The Pardon"
 PiL – "Rise" (12" Mix)
 PiL – "Disappointed" (12" Mix)
 PiL – "Warrior" (12" Mix)
 PiL – "Acid Drops"
 Leftfield/Lydon – "Open Up" (Full Vocal Mix)
 Sex Pistols – "God Save The Queen" (Dance Mix)

DVD

Music videos

 Anarchy in the UK (original EMI version)
 God Save The Queen
 Public Image
 Death Disco
 This is Not a Love Song
 Bad Life
 World Destruction
 Rise
 Home
 Seattle
 The Body (uncensored version)
 Warrior
 Disappointed
 Don't Ask Me (title version)
 Cruel
 Covered
 Open Up
 Sun

Video extras

Sex Pistols live tracks:
 "Pretty Vacant" – Finsbury Park 1996
 "Bodies" – Phoenix Festival 1996
 "Silver Machine" – Crystal Palace 2002

Audio extras
Unreleased PiL Monitor Mixes: 
 "Death Disco" (unedited monitor mix)
 "Albatross" (unedited monitor mix)
 "Albatross" ('Melodrama' mix)

References

John Lydon albums
2005 greatest hits albums
2005 video albums
Music video compilation albums
Virgin Records compilation albums
Virgin Records video albums